This page lists all described species of the spider family Dictynidae accepted by the World Spider Catalog :

A

Adenodictyna

Adenodictyna Ono, 2008
 A. kudoae Ono, 2008 (type) — Japan

Aebutina

Aebutina Simon, 1892
 A. binotata Simon, 1892 (type) — Ecuador, Brazil

Ajmonia

Ajmonia Caporiacco, 1934
 A. aurita Song & Lu, 1985 — Kazakhstan, China
 A. bedeshai (Tikader, 1966) — India (mainland, Andaman Is.)
 A. capucina (Schenkel, 1936) — China
 A. lehtineni Marusik & Koponen, 1998 — Mongolia
 A. marakata (Sherriffs, 1927) — India
 A. numidica (Denis, 1937) — Algeria
 A. patellaris (Simon, 1911) — Algeria
 A. procera (Kulczyński, 1901) — China
 A. psittacea (Schenkel, 1936) — China
 A. rajaeii Zamani & Marusik, 2017 — Iran
 A. smaragdula (Simon, 1905) — Sri Lanka
 A. velifera (Simon, 1906) (type) — India to China

Altella

Altella Simon, 1884
 A. aussereri Thaler, 1990 — Italy
 A. biuncata (Miller, 1949) — Central Europe
 A. caspia Ponomarev, 2008 — Kazakhstan
 A. conglobata Dyal, 1935 — Pakistan
 A. hungarica Loksa, 1981 — Hungary, Ukraine, Russia (Europe)
 A. lucida (Simon, 1874) (type) — Europe, Turkey
 A. media Wunderlich, 1992 — Canary Is.
 A. opaca Simon, 1911 — Algeria
 A. orientalis Balogh, 1935 — Hungary
 A. pygmaea Wunderlich, 1992 — Canary Is.
 A. uncata Simon, 1884 — Algeria

Anaxibia

Anaxibia Thorell, 1898
 A. caudiculata Thorell, 1898 (type) — Myanmar
 A. difficilis (Kraus, 1960) — São Tomé and Príncipe
 A. folia Sankaran & Sebastian, 2017 — India
 A. nigricauda (Simon, 1905) — Sri Lanka
 A. peteri (Lessert, 1933) — Angola
 A. pictithorax (Kulczyński, 1908) — Indonesia (Java)
 A. rebai (Tikader, 1966) — India (mainland, Andaman Is.)

Arangina

Arangina Lehtinen, 1967
 A. cornigera (Dalmas, 1917) (type) — New Zealand
 A. pluva Forster, 1970 — New Zealand

Archaeodictyna

Archaeodictyna Caporiacco, 1928
 A. ammophila (Menge, 1871) — Europe to Central Asia
 A. anguiniceps (Simon, 1899) (type) — North, East Africa
 A. condocta (O. Pickard-Cambridge, 1876) — North Africa, Kazakhstan
 A. consecuta (O. Pickard-Cambridge, 1872) — Europe, Caucasus, Russia (Europe to South Siberia), Iran, Central Asia, China
 A. minutissima (Miller, 1958) — Italy, Austria, Czechia, Slovakia, Ukraine, Russia (Europe)
 A. sexnotata (Simon, 1890) — Yemen
 A. suedicola (Simon, 1890) — Yemen
 A. tazzeiti (Denis, 1954) — Algeria
 A. ulova Griswold & Meikle-Griswold, 1987 — South Africa

Arctella

Arctella Holm, 1945
 A. lapponica Holm, 1945 (type) — Scandinavia, Russia (Europe to Far East), Mongolia, USA (Alaska), Canada

Argenna

Argenna Thorell, 1870
 A. alxa Tang, 2011 — China
 A. obesa Emerton, 1911 — USA, Canada
 A. patula (Simon, 1874) — Europe, Caucasus, Russia (Europe to South Siberia), Kyrgyzstan, China, Iran?
 A. polita (Banks, 1898) — Mexico
 A. sibirica Esyunin & Stepina, 2014 — Russia (West Siberia)
 A. subnigra (O. Pickard-Cambridge, 1861) (type) — Europe, Azerbaijan, China
 A. yakima Chamberlin & Gertsch, 1958 — USA
 † A. fossilis Petrunkevitch, 1957

Argennina

Argennina Gertsch & Mulaik, 1936
 A. unica Gertsch & Mulaik, 1936 (type) — USA

Argyroneta

Argyroneta Latreille, 1804
 A. aquatica (Clerck, 1757) (type) — Europe, Turkey, Caucasus, Russia (Europe to Far East), Iran, Central Asia, Mongolia, China, Korea, Japan
 † A. longipes Heer, 1865

† Arthrodictyna

† Arthrodictyna Petrunkevitch, 1942
 † A. segmentata Petrunkevitch, 1942

Atelolathys

Atelolathys Simon, 1892
 A. varia Simon, 1892 (type) — Sri Lanka

B

† Balticocryphoeca

† Balticocryphoeca Wunderlich, 2004
 † B. curvitarsis Wunderlich, 2004

Banaidja

Banaidja Lehtinen, 1967
 B. bifasciata (L. Koch, 1872) (type) — Samoa

Bannaella

Bannaella Zhang & Li, 2011
 B. lhasana (Hu, 2001) — China
 B. sinuata Zhang & Li, 2011 — China
 B. tibialis Zhang & Li, 2011 (type) — China

Brigittea

Brigittea Lehtinen, 1967
 B. civica (Lucas, 1850) — Europe, North Africa, Turkey, Iran. Introduced to North America
 B. guanchae (Schmidt, 1968) — Canary Is.
 B. innocens (O. Pickard-Cambridge, 1872) — Italy, Eastern Mediterranean, Kazakhstan
 B. latens (Fabricius, 1775) (type) — Europe to Central Asia
 B. varians (Spassky, 1952) — Russia (Europe), Kazakhstan, Tajikistan
 B. vicina (Simon, 1873) — Mediterranean to Central Asia

Brommella

Brommella Tullgren, 1948
 B. baiseensis Li, 2017 — China
 B. bishopi (Chamberlin & Gertsch, 1958) — USA
 B. casseabri Li, 2017 — China
 B. chongzuoensis Li, 2017 — China
 B. digitata Lu, Chen & Zhang, 2015 — China
 B. dolabrata Li, 2017 — China
 B. falcigera (Balogh, 1935) (type) — Europe, Turkey, Iran?
 B. funaria Li, 2017 — China
 B. hellenensis Wunderlich, 1995 — Greece
 B. josephkohi Li, 2017 — China
 B. lactea (Chamberlin & Gertsch, 1958) — USA
 B. linyuchengi Li, 2017 — China
 B. monticola (Gertsch & Mulaik, 1936) — USA
 B. punctosparsa (Oi, 1957) — China, Korea, Japan
 B. renguodongi Li, 2017 — China
 B. resima Li, 2017 — China
 B. sejuncta Li, 2017 — China
 B. spirula Li, 2017 — China
 B. tongyanfengi Li, 2017 — China
 B. wangfengcheni Li, 2017 — China
 B. xinganensis Li, 2017 — China
 B. yizhouensis Li, 2017 — China

† Brommellina

† Brommellina Wunderlich, 2004
 † B. longungulae Wunderlich, 2004

C

Callevophthalmus

Callevophthalmus Simon, 1906
 C. albus (Keyserling, 1890) (type) — Australia (mainland, Lord Howe Is.)
 C. maculatus (Keyserling, 1890) — Australia (New South Wales)

Chaerea

Chaerea Simon, 1884
 C. maritimus Simon, 1884 (type) — Algeria, Spain, France, Italy, Greece

† Chelicirrum

† Chelicirrum Wunderlich, 2004
 † C. stridulans Wunderlich, 2004

Clitistes

Clitistes Simon, 1902
 C. velutinus Simon, 1902 (type) — Chile

† Cryphoezaga

† Cryphoezaga Wunderlich, 2004
 † C. dubia Wunderlich, 2004

D

Devade

Devade Simon, 1884
 D. dubia Caporiacco, 1934 — Karakorum
 D. indistincta (O. Pickard-Cambridge, 1872) (type) — Mediterranean
 D. kazakhstanica Esyunin & Efimik, 2000 — Kazakhstan
 D. lehtineni Esyunin & Efimik, 2000 — Kazakhstan
 D. libanica (Denis, 1955) — Lebanon
 D. miranda Ponomarev, 2007 — Kazakhstan
 D. mongolica Esyunin & Marusik, 2001 — Mongolia
 D. naderii Zamani & Marusik, 2017 — Iran
 D. pusilla Simon, 1911 — Algeria
 D. tenella (Tystshenko, 1965) — Ukraine to China, Iran

Dictyna

Dictyna Sundevall, 1833
 D. abundans Chamberlin & Ivie, 1941 — USA
 D. agressa Ivie, 1947 — USA
 D. alaskae Chamberlin & Ivie, 1947 — North America, Northern Europe, Russia (Europe to Far East)
 D. albicoma Simon, 1893 — Venezuela
 D. albopilosa Franganillo, 1936 — Cuba
 D. albovittata Keyserling, 1881 — Peru
 D. alyceae Chickering, 1950 — Panama
 D. andesiana Berland, 1913 — Ecuador
 D. annexa Gertsch & Mulaik, 1936 — USA, Mexico
 D. apacheca Chamberlin & Ivie, 1935 — USA
 D. armata Thorell, 1875 — Ukraine, Russia (Europe, Caucasus)
 D. arundinacea (Linnaeus, 1758) (type) — North America, Europe, Turkey, Caucasus, Russia (Europe to Far East), Iran, Central Asia, China, Korea, Japan
 D. bellans Chamberlin, 1919 — USA, Mexico
 D. b. hatchi Jones, 1948 — USA
 D. bispinosa Simon, 1906 — Myanmar
 D. bostoniensis Emerton, 1888 — USA, Canada
 D. brevitarsa Emerton, 1915 — USA, Canada
 D. cafayate Mello-Leitão, 1941 — Argentina
 D. calcarata Banks, 1904 — USA, Mexico. Introduced to Hawaii
 D. cambridgei Gertsch & Ivie, 1936 — Mexico
 D. cavata Jones, 1947 — USA, Cuba
 D. cebolla Ivie, 1947 — USA
 D. chandrai Tikader, 1966 — India
 D. cholla Gertsch & Davis, 1942 — USA, Mexico
 D. colona Simon, 1906 — New Caledonia
 D. coloradensis Chamberlin, 1919 — USA
 D. columbiana Becker, 1886 — Venezuela
 D. cronebergi Simon, 1889 — Turkmenistan
 D. crosbyi Gertsch & Mulaik, 1940 — USA
 D. dahurica Danilov, 2000 — Russia (South Siberia)
 D. dauna Chamberlin & Gertsch, 1958 — USA, Bahama Is.
 D. denisi (Lehtinen, 1967) — Niger
 D. donaldi Chickering, 1950 — Panama
 D. dunini Danilov, 2000 — Russia (Urals to Far East)
 D. ectrapela (Keyserling, 1886) — Peru
 D. felis Bösenberg & Strand, 1906 — Russia (Far East), Mongolia, China, Korea, Japan
 D. fluminensis Mello-Leitão, 1924 — Brazil
 D. foliacea (Hentz, 1850) — USA, Canada
 D. foliicola Bösenberg & Strand, 1906 — Russia (Far East), China, Korea, Japan
 D. formidolosa Gertsch & Ivie, 1936 — USA, Canada
 D. fuerteventurensis Schmidt, 1976 — Canary Is.
 D. gloria Chamberlin & Ivie, 1944 — USA
 D. guerrerensis Gertsch & Davis, 1937 — Mexico
 D. guineensis Denis, 1955 — Guinea
 D. hamifera Thorell, 1872 — Greenland, Finland, Russia (Siberia)
 D. h. simulans Kulczyński, 1916 — Russia (West Siberia)
 D. idahoana Chamberlin & Ivie, 1933 — USA
 D. ignobilis Kulczyński, 1895 — Moldova, Armenia
 D. incredula Gertsch & Davis, 1937 — Mexico
 D. jacalana Gertsch & Davis, 1937 — Mexico
 D. juno Ivie, 1947 — USA
 D. kosiorowiczi Simon, 1873 — Western Mediterranean
 D. laeviceps Simon, 1911 — Algeria
 D. lecta Chickering, 1952 — Panama
 D. linzhiensis Hu, 2001 — China
 D. livida (Mello-Leitão, 1941) — Argentina
 D. longispina Emerton, 1888 — USA
 D. major Menge, 1869 — North America, Europe, Russia (Europe to Far East), Tajikistan, China
 D. marilina Chamberlin, 1948 — USA, Mexico
 D. meditata Gertsch, 1936 — Mexico to Panama, Cuba
 D. miniata Banks, 1898 — Mexico
 D. minuta Emerton, 1888 — USA, Canada
 D. moctezuma Gertsch & Davis, 1942 — Mexico
 D. mora Chamberlin & Gertsch, 1958 — USA
 D. namulinensis Hu, 2001 — China
 D. navajoa Gertsch & Davis, 1942 — Mexico
 D. nebraska Gertsch, 1946 — USA
 D. obydovi Marusik & Koponen, 1998 — Russia (South Siberia)
 D. ottoi Marusik & Koponen, 2017 — Caucasus (Russia, Georgia, Azerbaijan), Iran?
 D. palmgreni Marusik & Fritzén, 2011 — Finland, Russia (Europe to north-eastern Siberia)
 D. paramajor Danilov, 2000 — Russia (South Siberia)
 D. peon Chamberlin & Gertsch, 1958 — USA, Mexico
 D. personata Gertsch & Mulaik, 1936 — USA, Mexico
 D. pictella Chamberlin & Gertsch, 1958 — USA
 D. procerula Bösenberg & Strand, 1906 — Japan
 D. puebla Gertsch & Davis, 1937 — Mexico
 D. pusilla Thorell, 1856 — Europe, Turkey, Caucasus, Russia (Europe to Far East), Central Asia
 D. quadrispinosa Emerton, 1919 — USA
 D. ranchograndei Caporiacco, 1955 — Venezuela
 D. saepei Chamberlin & Ivie, 1941 — USA
 D. saltona Chamberlin & Gertsch, 1958 — USA
 D. sancta Gertsch, 1946 — USA, Canada
 D. schmidti Kulczyński, 1926 — Russia (West Siberia to Far East)
 D. secuta Chamberlin, 1924 — USA, Mexico
 D. sierra Chamberlin, 1948 — USA, Mexico
 D. similis Keyserling, 1878 — Uruguay
 D. simoni Petrunkevitch, 1911 — Venezuela
 D. sinaloa Gertsch & Davis, 1942 — Mexico
 D. siniloanensis Barrion & Litsinger, 1995 — Philippines
 D. sinuata Esyunin & Sozontov, 2016 — Ukraine, Russia (Europe)
 D. sonora Gertsch & Davis, 1942 — Mexico
 D. sotnik Danilov, 1994 — Russia (South Siberia)
 D. subpinicola Ivie, 1947 — USA
 D. sylvania Chamberlin & Ivie, 1944 — USA
 D. szaboi Chyzer, 1891 — Austria, Hungary, Czechia, Slovakia, Russia (Europe), Kazakhstan
 D. tarda Schmidt, 1971 — Ecuador
 D. terrestris Emerton, 1911 — USA
 D. togata Simon, 1904 — Chile
 D. tridentata Bishop & Ruderman, 1946 — USA
 D. tristis Spassky, 1952 — Tajikistan
 D. trivirgata Mello-Leitão, 1943 — Chile
 D. tucsona Chamberlin, 1948 — USA, Mexico
 D. tullgreni Caporiacco, 1949 — Kenya
 D. turbida Simon, 1905 — India, Sri Lanka
 D. tyshchenkoi Marusik, 1988 — Russia (Urals to Far East)
 D. t. wrangeliana Marusik, 1988 — Russia (Wrangel Is.)
 D. ubsunurica Marusik & Koponen, 1998 — Russia (South Siberia)
 D. umai Tikader, 1966 — India
 D. uncinata Thorell, 1856 — Europe, Turkey, Caucasus, Russia (Europe to Far East), Central Asia, China, Japan
 D. uvs Marusik & Koponen, 1998 — Russia (South Siberia)
 D. vittata Keyserling, 1883 — Peru
 D. volucripes Keyserling, 1881 — North America
 D. v. volucripoides Ivie, 1947 — USA
 D. vultuosa Keyserling, 1881 — Peru
 D. xizangensis Hu & Li, 1987 — China
 D. yongshun Yin, Bao & Kim, 2001 — China
 D. zhangmuensis Hu, 2001 — China
 † D. rufa Wunderlich, 2012

Dictynomorpha

Dictynomorpha Spassky, 1939
 D. daemonis Marusik, Esyunin & Tuneva, 2015 — Kazakhstan
 D. strandi Spassky, 1939 (type) — Kazakhstan, Uzbekistan, Turkmenistan, Kyrgyzstan

E

Emblyna

Emblyna Chamberlin, 1948
 E. acoreensis Wunderlich, 1992 — Azores
 E. aiko (Chamberlin & Gertsch, 1958) — USA
 E. altamira (Gertsch & Davis, 1942) — USA, Mexico, Greater Antilles
 E. angulata (Emerton, 1915) — USA
 E. annulipes (Blackwall, 1846) — North America, Europe, Turkey, Caucasus, Russia (Europe to Far East)
 E. ardea (Chamberlin & Gertsch, 1958) — USA
 E. artemisia (Ivie, 1947) — USA
 E. borealis (O. Pickard-Cambridge, 1877) — Russia (north-eastern Siberia), USA, Canada, Greenland
 E. b. cavernosa (Jones, 1947) — USA
 E. branchi (Chamberlin & Gertsch, 1958) — USA
 E. brevidens (Kulczyński, 1897) — Europe
 E. budarini Marusik, 1988 — Russia (north-eastern Siberia)
 E. burjatica (Danilov, 1994) — Russia (Urals to Far East)
 E. callida (Gertsch & Ivie, 1936) — USA, Mexico
 E. capens Chamberlin, 1948 — USA
 E. chitina (Chamberlin & Gertsch, 1958) — USA (Alaska), Canada
 E. completa (Chamberlin & Gertsch, 1929) (type) — USA
 E. completoides (Ivie, 1947) — USA, Canada
 E. consulta (Gertsch & Ivie, 1936) — North America
 E. cornupeta (Bishop & Ruderman, 1946) — USA, Mexico
 E. coweta (Chamberlin & Gertsch, 1958) — USA
 E. crocana Chamberlin, 1948 — USA
 E. cruciata (Emerton, 1888) — USA, Canada
 E. decaprini (Kaston, 1945) — USA
 E. evicta (Gertsch & Mulaik, 1940) — USA
 E. florens (Ivie & Barrows, 1935) — USA
 E. formicaria Baert, 1987 — Ecuador (Galapagos Is.)
 E. francisca (Bishop & Ruderman, 1946) — USA
 E. hentzi (Kaston, 1945) — USA, Canada
 E. horta (Gertsch & Ivie, 1936) — USA
 E. hoya (Chamberlin & Ivie, 1941) — USA
 E. iviei (Gertsch & Mulaik, 1936) — USA, Mexico
 E. joaquina (Chamberlin & Gertsch, 1958) — USA
 E. jonesae (Roewer, 1955) — USA
 E. kaszabi Marusik & Koponen, 1998 — Mongolia
 E. klamatha (Chamberlin & Gertsch, 1958) — USA
 E. lina (Gertsch, 1946) — USA, Mexico
 E. linda (Chamberlin & Gertsch, 1958) — USA
 E. littoricolens (Chamberlin & Ivie, 1935) — USA
 E. manitoba (Ivie, 1947) — USA, Canada
 E. mariae Chamberlin, 1948 — USA, Mexico
 E. marissa (Chamberlin & Gertsch, 1958) — USA
 E. maxima (Banks, 1892) — USA, Canada
 E. melva (Chamberlin & Gertsch, 1958) — USA
 E. mitis (Thorell, 1875) — Norway, Germany, Czechia, Hungary, Romania
 E. mongolica Marusik & Koponen, 1998 — Russia (Europe to South Siberia), Mongolia
 E. nanda (Chamberlin & Gertsch, 1958) — USA
 E. oasa (Ivie, 1947) — USA
 E. olympiana (Chamberlin, 1919) — USA
 E. orbiculata (Jones, 1947) — USA
 E. oregona (Gertsch, 1946) — USA
 E. osceola (Chamberlin & Gertsch, 1958) — USA
 E. oxtotilpanensis (Jiménez & Luz, 1986) — Mexico
 E. palomara Chamberlin, 1948 — USA
 E. peragrata (Bishop & Ruderman, 1946) — USA, Canada
 E. phylax (Gertsch & Ivie, 1936) — USA, Canada
 E. pinalia (Chamberlin & Gertsch, 1958) — USA
 E. piratica (Ivie, 1947) — USA
 E. reticulata (Gertsch & Ivie, 1936) — USA, Mexico
 E. roscida (Hentz, 1850) — North, Central America
 E. saylori (Chamberlin & Ivie, 1941) — USA
 E. scotta Chamberlin, 1948 — USA, Mexico
 E. seminola (Chamberlin & Gertsch, 1958) — USA
 E. serena (Chamberlin & Gertsch, 1958) — USA
 E. shasta (Chamberlin & Gertsch, 1958) — USA
 E. shoshonea (Chamberlin & Gertsch, 1958) — USA
 E. stulta (Gertsch & Mulaik, 1936) — USA
 E. sublata (Hentz, 1850) — Canada, USA, Mexico
 E. sublatoides (Ivie & Barrows, 1935) — USA
 E. suprenans (Chamberlin & Ivie, 1935) — USA
 E. suwanea (Gertsch, 1946) — USA
 E. teideensis Wunderlich, 1992 — Canary Is.
 E. uintana (Chamberlin, 1919) — USA
 E. wangi (Song & Zhou, 1986) — Russia (Europe to South Siberia), Kazakhstan, Mongolia, China
 E. zaba (Barrows & Ivie, 1942) — USA
 E. zherikhini (Marusik, 1988) — Russia (Middle Siberia to Far East)

† Eobrommella

† Eobrommella Wunderlich, 2004
 † E. scutata Wunderlich, 2004

† Eocryphoeca

† Eocryphoeca Petrunkevitch, 1946
 † E. bitterfeldensis Wunderlich, 2004 
 † E. electrina Wunderlich, 2004 
 † E. falcata Wunderlich, 2004 
 † E. gibbifera Wunderlich, 2004 
 † E. gracilipes Koch and Berendt, 1854 
 † E. ligula Wunderlich, 2004 
 † E. mammilla Wunderlich, 2004 
 † E. splendens Wunderlich, 2004

† Eocryphoecara

† Eocryphoecara Wunderlich, 2004
 † E. abicera Wunderlich, 2004

† Eodictyna

† Eodictyna Wunderlich, 2004
 † E. communis Wunderlich, 2004

† Eolathys

† Eolathys Petrunkevitch, 1950
 † E. debilis Petrunkevitch, 1950 
 † E. succini Petrunkevitch, 1950

F

† Flagelldictyna

† Flagelldictyna Wunderlich, 2012
 † F. copalis Wunderlich, 2012

G

† Gibbermastigusa

† Gibbermastigusa Wunderlich, 2004
 † G. lateralis Wunderlich, 2004

H

Hackmania

Hackmania Lehtinen, 1967
 H. prominula (Tullgren, 1948) (type) — North America, Northern Europe, Russia (Europe to Far East)
 H. saphes (Chamberlin, 1948) — USA

Helenactyna

Helenactyna Benoit, 1977
 H. crucifera (O. Pickard-Cambridge, 1873) (type) — St. Helena
 H. vicina Benoit, 1977 — St. Helena

† Hispaniolyna

† Hispaniolyna Wunderlich, 1988
 † H. hirsuta Wunderlich, 1988 
 † H. magna Wunderlich, 1988

Hoplolathys

Hoplolathys Caporiacco, 1947
 H. aethiopica Caporiacco, 1947 (type) — Ethiopia

I

Iviella

Iviella Lehtinen, 1967
 I. newfoundlandensis Pickavance & Dondale, 2010 — Canada
 I. ohioensis (Chamberlin & Ivie, 1935) (type) — USA
 I. reclusa (Gertsch & Ivie, 1936) — USA, Canada

K

Kharitonovia

Kharitonovia Esyunin, Zamani & Tuneva, 2017
 K. uzbekistanica (Charitonov, 1946) (type) — Iran, Uzbekistan

L

Lathys

Lathys Simon, 1884
 L. adunca Liu, 2018 — China
 L. affinis (Blackwall, 1862) — Madeira, Portugal?
 L. alberta Gertsch, 1946 — USA, Canada, Russia (South Siberia to Far East)
 L. albida Gertsch, 1946 — USA
 L. ankaraensis Özkütük, Marusik, Elverici & Kunt, 2016 — Turkey
 L. annulata Bösenberg & Strand, 1906 — Korea, Japan
 L. arabs Simon, 1910 — Algeria, Tunisia, Greece, Cyprus
 L. bin Marusik & Logunov, 1991 — Russia (Kurile Is.)
 L. borealis Zhang, Hu & Zhang, 2012 — China
 L. brevitibialis Denis, 1956 — Morocco
 L. cambridgei (Simon, 1874) — Israel
 L. changtunesis Hu, 2001 — China
 L. chishuiensis Zhang, Yang & Zhang, 2009 — China
 L. coralynae Gertsch & Davis, 1942 — Mexico
 L. delicatula (Gertsch & Mulaik, 1936) — USA
 L. deltoidea Liu, 2018 — China
 L. dentichelis (Simon, 1883) — Azores, Canary Is.
 L. dihamata Paik, 1979 — Korea, Japan
 L. dixiana Ivie & Barrows, 1935 — USA
 L. fibulata Liu, 2018 — China
 L. foxi (Marx, 1891) — USA
 L. heterophthalma Kulczyński, 1891 — Europe, Russia (Europe to West Siberia)
 L. huangyangjieensis Liu, 2018 — China
 L. humilis (Blackwall, 1855) (type) — Europe, Turkey, Caucasus, Iran, Central Asia. Introduced to Canada
 L. h. meridionalis (Simon, 1874) — Spain, France (mainland, Corsica), North Africa
 L. immaculata (Chamberlin & Ivie, 1944) — USA
 L. inaffecta Li, 2017 — China
 L. insulana Ono, 2003 — Japan
 L. jubata (Denis, 1947) — France
 L. lehtineni Kovblyuk, Kastrygina & Omelko, 2014 — Ukraine, Russia (Europe), Iran?
 L. lepida O. Pickard-Cambridge, 1909 — Spain
 L. lutulenta Simon, 1914 — France
 L. maculina Gertsch, 1946 — USA
 L. maculosa (Karsch, 1879) — Korea, Japan
 L. mallorcensis Lissner, 2018 — Spain (Majorca)
 L. maura (Simon, 1911) — Algeria
 L. narbonensis (Simon, 1876) — France, Italy
 L. pallida (Marx, 1891) — USA, Canada
 L. pygmaea Wunderlich, 2011 — Canary Is.
 L. sexoculata Seo & Sohn, 1984 — Korea, Japan
 L. sexpustulata (Simon, 1878) — France, Morocco
 L. simplicior (Dalmas, 1916) — Algeria
 L. sindi (Caporiacco, 1934) — Karakorum
 L. spasskyi Andreeva & Tystshenko, 1969 — Turkey, Azerbaijan, Kazakhstan, Uzbekistan, Kyrgyzstan, Tajikistan
 L. spiralis Zhang, Hu & Zhang, 2012 — China
 L. stigmatisata (Menge, 1869) — Europe, Turkey
 L. subalberta Zhang, Hu & Zhang, 2012 — China
 L. subhumilis Zhang, Hu & Zhang, 2012 — China
 L. subviridis Denis, 1937 — Algeria
 L. sylvania Chamberlin & Gertsch, 1958 — USA
 L. teideensis Wunderlich, 1992 — Canary Is.
 L. truncata Danilov, 1994 — Russia (Central Asia, South Siberia), Kazakhstan
 L. zhanfengi Liu, 2018 — China

M

Mallos

Mallos O. Pickard-Cambridge, 1902
 M. blandus Chamberlin & Gertsch, 1958 — USA
 M. bryanti Gertsch, 1946 — USA, Mexico
 M. chamberlini Bond & Opell, 1997 — Mexico
 M. dugesi (Becker, 1886) — USA, Mexico
 M. flavovittatus (Keyserling, 1881) — Venezuela, Peru
 M. gertschi Bond & Opell, 1997 — Mexico
 M. gregalis (Simon, 1909) — Mexico
 M. hesperius (Chamberlin, 1916) — Mexico to Paraguay
 M. kraussi Gertsch, 1946 — Mexico
 M. macrolirus Bond & Opell, 1997 — Mexico
 M. margaretae Gertsch, 1946 — Costa Rica, Panama
 M. mians (Chamberlin, 1919) — USA, Mexico
 M. nigrescens (Caporiacco, 1955) — Venezuela
 M. niveus O. Pickard-Cambridge, 1902 (type) — USA, Mexico
 M. pallidus (Banks, 1904) — USA, Mexico
 M. pearcei Chamberlin & Gertsch, 1958 — USA

Marilynia

Marilynia Lehtinen, 1967
 M. bicolor (Simon, 1870) (type) — Europe to Central Asia, North Africa
 M. b. littoralis (Denis, 1959) — France

Mashimo

Mashimo Lehtinen, 1967
 M. leleupi Lehtinen, 1967 (type) — Zambia

† Mastigusa

† Mastigusa Menge, 1854
 † M. acuminata Menge, 1854 
 † M. arcuata Wunderlich, 2004 
 † M. bitterfeldensis Wunderlich, 2004 
 † M. laticymbium Wunderlich, 2004 
 † M. magnibulbus Wunderlich, 2004 
 † M. media Wunderlich, 1986 
 † M. modesta Wunderlich, 1986 
 † M. scutata Wunderlich, 2004

Mexitlia

Mexitlia Lehtinen, 1967
 M. altima Bond & Opell, 1997 — Mexico
 M. grandis (O. Pickard-Cambridge, 1896) — Mexico
 M. trivittata (Banks, 1901) (type) — USA, Mexico

Mizaga

Mizaga Simon, 1898
 M. chevreuxi Simon, 1898 (type) — Senegal
 M. racovitzai (Fage, 1909) — Mediterranean

† Mizagalla

† Mizagalla Wunderlich, 2004
 † M. quattuor Wunderlich, 2004 
 † M. tuberculata Wunderlich, 2004

Myanmardictyna

Myanmardictyna Wunderlich, 2017
 M. longifissum Wunderlich, 2017 (type) — Myanmar

N

Nigma

Nigma Lehtinen, 1967
 N. albida (O. Pickard-Cambridge, 1885) — India, Pakistan, China (Yarkand)
 N. conducens (O. Pickard-Cambridge, 1876) — North Africa
 N. flavescens (Walckenaer, 1830) (type) — Europe, Caucasus, Iran
 N. gertschi (Berland & Millot, 1940) — Senegal
 N. gratiosa (Simon, 1881) — Portugal, Spain, North Africa
 N. hortensis (Simon, 1870) — Portugal, Spain, France, Algeria
 N. laeta (Spassky, 1952) — Azerbaijan, Iran, Tajikistan
 N. linsdalei (Chamberlin & Gertsch, 1958) — USA
 N. longipes (Berland, 1914) — East Africa
 N. nangquianensis (Hu, 2001) — China
 N. puella (Simon, 1870) — Europe, Azores, Madeira, Canary Is.
 N. shiprai (Tikader, 1966) — India
 N. tuberosa Wunderlich, 1987 — Canary Is.
 N. vulnerata (Simon, 1914) — Mediterranean
 N. walckenaeri (Roewer, 1951) — Europe, Turkey, Caucasus

P

† Palaeodictyna

† Palaeodictyna Wunderlich, 1988
 † P. intermedia Wunderlich, 1988 
 † P. longispina Wunderlich, 1988 
 † P. singularis Wunderlich, 1988 
 † P. spiculum Wunderlich, 1988 
 † P. termitophila Wunderlich, 1988 
 † P. unispina Wunderlich, 1988

† Palaeolathys

† Palaeolathys Wunderlich, 1986
 † P. circumductus Wunderlich, 1988 
 † P. copalis Wunderlich, 1986 
 † P. quadruplex Wunderlich, 1988 
 † P. similis Wunderlich, 1988 
 † P. spinosa Wunderlich, 1986

Paradictyna

Paradictyna Forster, 1970
 P. ilamia Forster, 1970 — New Zealand
 P. rufoflava (Chamberlain, 1946) (type) — New Zealand

Paratheuma

Paratheuma Bryant, 1940
 P. andromeda Beatty & Berry, 1989 — Cook Is.
 P. armata (Marples, 1964) — Caroline Is. to Samoa
 P. australis Beatty & Berry, 1989 — Australia (Queensland), Fiji
 P. awasensis Shimojana, 2013 — Japan (Okinawa)
 P. enigmatica Zamani, Marusik & Berry, 2016 — Iran
 P. insulana (Banks, 1902) (type) — USA, Caribbean. Introduced to Japan
 P. interaesta (Roth & Brown, 1975) — Mexico
 P. makai Berry & Beatty, 1989 — Hawaii
 P. ramseyae Beatty & Berry, 1989 — Cook Is.
 P. rangiroa Beatty & Berry, 1989 — Polynesia
 P. shirahamaensis (Oi, 1960) — Korea, Japan

Penangodyna

Penangodyna Wunderlich, 1995
 P. tibialis Wunderlich, 1995 (type) — Malaysia

Phantyna

Phantyna Chamberlin, 1948
 P. bicornis (Emerton, 1915) — USA, Canada
 P. estebanensis (Simon, 1906) — Venezuela
 P. mandibularis (Taczanowski, 1874) — Mexico to Brazil
 P. meridensis (Caporiacco, 1955) — Venezuela
 P. micro (Chamberlin & Ivie, 1944) (type) — USA
 P. mulegensis (Chamberlin, 1924) — USA, Mexico
 P. pixi (Chamberlin & Gertsch, 1958) — USA
 P. provida (Gertsch & Mulaik, 1936) — USA
 P. remota (Banks, 1924) — Ecuador (Galapagos Is.)
 P. rita (Gertsch, 1946) — USA
 P. segregata (Gertsch & Mulaik, 1936) — USA, Mexico
 P. terranea (Ivie, 1947) — USA
 P. varyna (Chamberlin & Gertsch, 1958) — USA, Mexico
 P. v. miranda (Chamberlin & Gertsch, 1958) — USA

† Protomastigusa

† Protomastigusa Wunderlich, 2004
 † P. composita Wunderlich, 2004

Q

Qiyunia

Qiyunia Song & Xu, 1989
 Q. lehtineni Song & Xu, 1989 (type) — China, Japan

R

Rhion

Rhion O. Pickard-Cambridge, 1871
 R. pallidum O. Pickard-Cambridge, 1871 (type) — Sri Lanka

S

Saltonia

Saltonia Chamberlin & Ivie, 1942
 S. incerta (Banks, 1898) (type) — USA

† Scopulyna

† Scopulyna Wunderlich, 2004
 † S. cursor Wunderlich, 2004

Scotolathys

Scotolathys Simon, 1884
 S. simplex Simon, 1884 (type) — Algeria, Spain, North Macedonia, Greece, Ukraine, Israel

Shango

Shango Lehtinen, 1967
 S. capicola (Strand, 1909) (type) — South Africa

† Succinyna

† Succinyna Wunderlich, 1988
 † S. longembolus Wunderlich, 1988 
 † S. pulcher Wunderlich, 1988 
 † S. spinipalpus Wunderlich, 1988

Sudesna

Sudesna Lehtinen, 1967
 S. anaulax (Simon, 1908) — Australia (Western Australia)
 S. circularis Zhang & Li, 2011 — China
 S. digitata Zhang & Li, 2011 — China
 S. flavipes (Hu, 2001) — China
 S. grammica (Simon, 1893) — Philippines
 S. grossa (Simon, 1906) — India
 S. hedini (Schenkel, 1936) (type) — China, Korea

T

Tahuantina

Tahuantina Lehtinen, 1967
 T. zapfeae Lehtinen, 1967 (type) — Chile

Tandil

Tandil Mello-Leitão, 1940
 T. nostalgicus Mello-Leitão, 1940 (type) — Argentina

Thallumetus

Thallumetus Simon, 1893
 T. acanthochirus Simon, 1904 — Chile
 T. dulcineus Gertsch, 1946 — Panama
 T. latifemur (Soares & Camargo, 1948) — Brazil
 T. octomaculellus (Gertsch & Davis, 1937) — Mexico
 T. parvulus Bryant, 1942 — Virgin Is.
 T. pineus (Chamberlin & Ivie, 1944) — USA
 T. pullus Chickering, 1952 — Panama
 T. pusillus Chickering, 1950 — Panama
 T. salax Simon, 1893 (type) — Venezuela
 T. simoni Gertsch, 1945 — Guyana
 † T. copalis Wunderlich, 2004

Tivyna

Tivyna Chamberlin, 1948
 T. moaba (Ivie, 1947) — USA
 T. pallida (Keyserling, 1887) (type) — USA
 T. petrunkevitchi (Gertsch & Mulaik, 1940) — USA
 T. spatula (Gertsch & Davis, 1937) — USA, Mexico, Cuba, Bahama Is.

Tricholathys

Tricholathys Chamberlin & Ivie, 1935
 T. cascadea Chamberlin & Gertsch, 1958 — USA
 T. hansi (Schenkel, 1950) — USA
 T. hirsutipes (Banks, 1921) — USA
 T. jacinto Chamberlin & Gertsch, 1958 — USA
 T. knulli Gertsch & Mulaik, 1936 — USA
 T. monterea Chamberlin & Gertsch, 1958 — USA
 T. ovtchinnikovi Marusik, Omelko & Ponomarev, 2017 — Russia (Caucasus)
 T. relicta Ovtchinnikov, 2001 — Kyrgyzstan
 T. rothi Chamberlin & Gertsch, 1958 — Canada, USA
 T. saltona Chamberlin, 1948 — USA
 T. spiralis Chamberlin & Ivie, 1935 (type) — Canada, USA
 T. subnivalis (Ovtchinnikov, 1989) — Kyrgyzstan, Tajikistan

V

† Vectaraneus

† Vectaraneus Selden, 2001
 † V. yulei Selden, 2001

Viridictyna

Viridictyna Forster, 1970
 V. australis Forster, 1970 — New Zealand
 V. kikkawai Forster, 1970 (type) — New Zealand
 V. nelsonensis Forster, 1970 — New Zealand
 V. parva Forster, 1970 — New Zealand
 V. picata Forster, 1970 — New Zealand

References

Dictynidae